Hansa-Park is a seasonal amusement park in Sierksdorf, Schleswig-Holstein, Germany off the Baltic Sea. It was opened on May 15, 1977 under the name Hansaland and renamed Hansa-Park in 1987. It currently spans  and includes more than 125 attractions. From 1973 to 1976, the site was home to the first German Legoland.

The park is owned by the Leicht family and managed by Christoph Andreas Leicht. The park attracts more than a million visitors each year, making it the fifth largest German amusement park. Stern magazine, in collaboration with the BAT Freizeit-Forschungsinstitut (Leisure Research Institute) tested the ten leading German amusement parks. Hansa-Park scored second place behind Europa-Park overall and first place in the north. The Family Park by the Sea was the first German amusement park to receive the OK for Kids seal of approval from the Deutscher Kinderschutzbund (the German Association for the Protection of Children) and TÜV Nord (Technical Inspection Association, North) for the whole park.

The grounds are divided into eleven different themed areas, including Adventure Land, Old-Time Fun Fair, Beautiful Britain, Bonanza-City, The Realms of the North, Fiesta del Mar, Hansa Garden, The HANSEATIC LEAGUE in EUROPE, Lumberjacks' Camp, Children's World, Water Fun and Land of the Vikings. Each of these areas contains rides and shows consistent with its theme. The park's special charm lies in its careful and detailed use of theming, with many little gags positioned along the way to the large attractions.

List of rides

Roller coasters

Water rides

Other rides

Former rides

Shows and events

The Mexican theme world hosts the International Variety Show, the Multi-Media- & Special-Effect-Show, a cinema showing 4D films and The Talking Fountain, a fountain with hidden speakers and water syringes. It is also the starting point of the daily HANSA-PARK Parade. There is a children's show in the Old-Time Fun Fair theme world and a Water Circus featuring Patagonian Sea Lions.

There are various seasonal Park Events.

References

External links 

 

Amusement parks in Germany
Buildings and structures in Schleswig-Holstein
Tourist attractions in Schleswig-Holstein
1977 establishments in West Germany
Amusement parks opened in 1977